Sun Deng (Wade–Giles: Sun Teng) is the name of:

Sun Deng (Xin dynasty) (died 26 AD), rebel leader
Sun Deng (Eastern Wu) (209–241), crown prince
Sun Deng (recluse) (third century), Taoist recluse